The 2022–23 season is the 115th season in the existence of Inter Milan, which have all been played in the top division of Italian football. In addition to the domestic league, Inter will participate in this season's editions of the Coppa Italia, the Supercoppa Italiana and the UEFA Champions League.

Players

First-team squad

Youth academy players

Other players under contract

Transfers

In

Transfers

On loan

Loan returns

Out

Transfers

Loans out

Loans ended

Notes

Pre-season and friendlies

Competitions

Overview

Serie A

League table

Results summary

Results by round

Matches
The league fixtures were announced on 24 June 2022.

Coppa Italia

Supercoppa Italiana

UEFA Champions League

Group stage 

The draw for the group stage was held on 25 August 2022.

Knockout phase

Round of 16
The draw for the round of 16 was held on 7 November 2022.

Quarter-finals
The draw for the quarter-finals was held on 17 March 2023.

Statistics

Appearances and goals

|-
! colspan=14 style="background:#dcdcdc; text-align:center| Goalkeepers

|-
! colspan=14 style="background:#dcdcdc; text-align:center| Defenders

|-
! colspan=14 style="background:#dcdcdc; text-align:center| Midfielders 

|-
! colspan=14 style="background:#dcdcdc; text-align:center| Forwards

|-
! colspan=14 style="background:#dcdcdc; text-align:center| Players transferred out during the season

Goalscorers

Assists

Clean sheets

Disciplinary record

References

Inter Milan seasons
Inter Milan
Inter Milan